The following is a list of courts and tribunals of the Commonwealth of Australia:

List of boards, commissions, courts, and tribunals

Sitting boards, commissions, courts, and tribunals

Sitting boards
Australian Accounting Standards Board
Australian Classification Board
Australian Motor Vehicle Certification Board  
Companies Auditors Disciplinary Board 
CSS Board
Foreign Investment Review Board
Life Insurance Actuarial Standards Board
Military Superannuation and Benefits Board of Trustees No. 1
Pooled Development Funds Registration Board
Professional Standards Board for Patent and Trade Marks Attorneys 
PSS Board
Veterans' Review Board

Sitting councils
Australian Loan Council
Administrative Review Council
Advisory Council on Intellectual Property
Anindilyakawa Land Council
ANZLIC—The Spatial Information Council
Australia Council
Australian Defence Force Academy Consultative Council
Australian Heritage Council
Australian Landcare Council
Australian Learning and Teaching Council
Australian Maritime Defence Council 
Australian National Council on Drugs
Australian Pharmaceutical Advisory Council
Australian Political Exchange Council
Australian Procurement and Construction Ministerial Council
Australian Research Council
Australian Science, Technology and Engineering Council
Australian Statistics Advisory Council
Australian Transport Council
Business-Industry-Higher Education Collaboration Council
Central Land Council
Commonwealth Consumer Affairs Advisory Council
Community Services Ministers' Advisory Council
Criminology Research Council
Defence Exporters Council
Defence Reserves Support Council
Environment Protection and Heritage Council  
Family Law Council
Financial Reporting Council
Financial Sector Advisory Council
Great Barrier Reef Ministerial Council 
International Legal Services Advisory Council
Kimberley Land Council
Local Government and Planning Ministers' Council
Ministerial Council for Aboriginal and Torres Strait Islander Affairs
Ministerial Council for Corporations
Ministerial Council on Consumer Affairs
Ministerial Council on Gambling
Ministerial Council on Mineral and Petroleum Resources
Ministerial Council on the Administration of Justice
Murray-Darling Basin Ministerial Council
National Alternative Dispute Resolution Advisory Council
National Australia Day Council
National Competition Council
National Environment Protection Council
National Environmental Education Council
National Health and Medical Research Council
National Indigenous Council 
National Rural Advisory Council
National Workplace Relations Consultative Council 
Natural Resource Management Ministerial Council
New South Wales World Heritage Properties Ministerial Council
Northern Land Council
Primary Industries Ministerial Council
Quarantine and Exports Advisory Council
Regional Development Council
Specialist Medical Review Council
Tasmanian Wilderness World Heritage Area Ministerial Council
Tiwi Land Council
Tourism Ministers' Council
Trade Policy Advisory Council
Wet Tropics Ministerial Council 
Workplace Relations Ministers Council

Sitting commissions
Australian Competition and Consumer Commission
Australian Crime Commission
Australian Electoral Commission
Australian Energy Market Commission 
Australian Human Rights Commission
Australian Law Reform Commission
Australian Public Service Commission
Australian Securities and Investments Commission
Australian Sports Commission
Australian Trade Commission (Austrade)
Commonwealth Grants Commission
International Air Services Commission
Military Rehabilitation & Compensation Commission
Murray-Darling Basin Commission
National Mental Health Commission
National Transport Commission
National Water Commission
Productivity Commission
Safety, Rehabilitation and Compensation Commission

Sitting courts 
 High Court of Australia
 Federal Court of Australia
 Federal Circuit and Family Court

Sitting tribunals
Administrative Appeals Tribunal
Australian Competition Tribunal
Copyright Tribunal
Defence Force Discipline Appeal Tribunal
Defence Force Remuneration Tribunal
Fair Work Commission
Federal Police Disciplinary Tribunal
National Native Title Tribunal
National Sports Tribunal
Remuneration Tribunal Secretariat
Superannuation Complaints Tribunal

Abolished boards, courts and tribunals

Abolished boards
Army Inventions Board
Australian Shipping Board
Australian Wool Board
Commonwealth Marine Salvage Board

Abolished commissions
Australian Fair Pay Commission
Aboriginal and Torres Strait Islander Commission
Export Wheat Commission
Inter-State Commission (1912–1920, 1975–1989)

Abolished courts 
Australian Industrial Court  (1973–1977)
Australian Military Court (2007–2009)
Commonwealth Court of Conciliation and Arbitration (1904–1956)
Commonwealth Industrial Court  (1956–1973)
 Family Court (1976–2021)
 Federal Circuit Court / Federal Magistrates Court (1999–2021)
Federal Court of Bankruptcy (1930–1977)
Industrial Relations Court of Australia (1994–1996)

Abolished tribunals
Australian Coal Industry Tribunal (1940–1995)
Australian Conciliation and Arbitration Commission (1973–1988)
Australian Industrial Relations Commission (1988–2009)
Commonwealth Conciliation and Arbitration Commission (1956–1973)
Fair Work Australia (2010–2012)
Migration Review Tribunal
Refugee Review Tribunal
Social Security Appeals Tribunal

Notes

See also

 Australian court hierarchy
 Government of Australia
 List of Australian government entities

Australia